Lovely is a 2001 Indian Tamil-language romantic drama film directed by S. K. Jeeva (credited as Sakthi) who previously directed Pudhumai Pithan. The film stars Karthik, Malavika, and Monal, while Vivek, Manivannan, Nizhalgal Ravi, and Vinu Chakravarthy play supporting roles. The film's score and soundtrack are composed by Deva. The film was released on 6 July 2001. It was remade in Telugu as Andamaina Abaddham with Raja and Kamna.

Plot
The movie revolves around Chandru (Karthik) and his lover Niveditha (Malavika) in the backdrop of Ooty. Niveditha's father Mahadevan (Manivannan) is against love marriages, and he finds out that his daughter is in love with someone. Mahadevan asks Niveditha for the details of her lover, and Niveditha as per Chandru's plan, hands over a photo of Chandru's friend Azhagesh to her father and informs him as her lover. Mahadevan sends some goons to attack Azhagesh, and the proceedings happen comically.

Meanwhile, Chandru and Niveditha keep planning on how to make Mahadevan nod for their wedding. One day, Mahadevan's car gets repaired on the way. Chandru, along with his family, also comes on the same way. Seeing Mahadevan helpless on the road, Chandru picks him up and drops him at home, thereby getting into Mahadevan's good books. Slowly, Mahadevan and Chandru become good family friends. But still, Chandru and Niveditha do not reveal their love to their parents and are happy that both families are on good terms now.

Chandru's parents decide to get him married to Niveditha, and they meet Mahadevan with a marriage proposal. Mahadevan also agrees for the wedding and informs Niveditha, who still pretends that she is in love with Azhagesh. Chandru and Niveditha feel happy that things are proceeding well as per the plan and their wedding is going to be a smooth one. But to everyone's surprise, a few days before the wedding, Chandru's brother elopes with Niveditha's sister. Both families start searching for them, and in the meantime, the families start quarrelling over each other due to this issue and separate. Finally, Chandru finds the eloped couple in a police station. It is revealed that Niveditha's sister wanted to cancel Niveditha's wedding with Chandru as she thought that Niveditha was in love in Azhagesh. Hence, Chandru's brother helps in the plan, and they staged the drama so that both the families will fight and the wedding will be cancelled.

Chandru is shocked hearing this and reveals that Niveditha was in love only with him and Azhagesh was just meant to divert Mahadevan. But Mahadevan overhears this and gets furious that Chandru and Niveditha cheated him. Finally, Chandru apologizes, and Mahadevan forgives him as he really is impressed with his character. Chandru and Niveditha are united.

Cast

Karthik as Chandru
Malavika as Nivedha Mahadevan
Monal as Madhubala
Vivek as Azhagesh (Algates)
Manivannan as Mahadevan, Nivedha's father
Nizhalgal Ravi as Chandru's father
Vinu Chakravarthy as Panneerselvam
Shanthi Williams as Nivedha's mother
Mahanadi Shankar as Thottapetta Gaja
Sindhu as Nivedha's sister
K. R. Vatsala as Chandru's mother
Delhi Ganesh as Mahadevan's father
S. N. Lakshmi as Nivedha's grandmother
Pandu as Paneerselvam's sidekick
J. Lalitha as Chandru's aunt
Aishwarya as Nivedha's sister
Meenal as Nurse Madhumitha

Production
The film was announced with Karthik and Devayani, but the actress's impending marriage meant that she was replaced by Malavika. The film was directed by Sakthi who earlier directed Parthiban starrer Pudhumai Pithan (1998) under the name S. K. Jeeva.

Soundtrack
Soundtrack was composed by Deva.

Reception
BBthots wrote "The director's sole intention here is to make the viewers laugh and that is clear from his scant disregard for the other tracks in the movie. [..] The movie is intended to be a light-hearted romp and since the comedy is successful in making us laugh, it works". The Hindu wrote "Lovely has enticing visuals and guileless humour - Vivek, Vinu Chakravarthy style. If only the unwarranted convolutions in the end had been avoided, the film would have probably been as enjoyable [..]".

References

2001 films
2000s Tamil-language films
Films scored by Deva (composer)
Indian romantic comedy films
2001 romantic comedy films